Christian Hammer (born Cristian Ciocan) is a Romanian-German professional boxer who held the WBO European heavyweight title three times between 2012 and 2018.

Professional career
Ciocan's first coach was Felix Păun.

Hammer vs. Gregorin 
He turned pro in Germany in 2008, but lost against Robert Gregorin his professional debut.

He won his next seven fights, but his winning streak was ended in 2010 after losing two fights in a row against Mariusz Wach and Taras Bidenko. Ciocan won the Won German International Heavyweight title in 2012 from Serdar Uysal, and vacant WBO EU Heavyweight title from Danny Williams.

Hammer vs. Fury 
In 2015, he lost to British future world champion, Tyson Fury for the WBO International Heavyweight title.

Hammer vs. Teper 
He held the WBO European Heavyweight title, which he won from Erkan Teper in 2016.

Hammer vs. Ortiz 
On March 2, 2019, Hammer fought title contented Luis Ortiz. Ortiz was ranked #3 by the WBC and #8 by the IBF at heavyweight at the time. Ortiz won the fight convincingly, winning 100-90 and 99-91 twice on the scorecards.

Hammer vs. Yoka 
On November 27, 2020, Hammer faced Tony Yoka. Yoka won the fight in convincing fashion, winning 100-89 across all three scorecards.

Hammer vs. H. Fury 
On October 16, 2021, Hammer fought Hughie Fury. Fury was ranked #4 by the WBA and #14 by the IBF and heavyweight. Hammer was forced to retire in the fifth round due to injury.

Professional boxing record

References

External links

2006 Junior World Amateur Boxing Championships
2008 Romanian National Championships
Christian Hammer - Profile, News Archive & Current Rankings at Box.Live

Romanian male boxers
Heavyweight boxers
Living people
Sportspeople from Galați
German male boxers
Romanian expatriate sportspeople in Germany
1987 births